{{Infobox Monarch
| name=Æthelwealh
| image=Ethelwolfe - John Speed.JPG
| caption=Imaginary depiction of Æthelwealh from John Speed's 1611 "Saxon Heptarchy"
| succession=King of Sussex
| rank=
| reign=fl.  – 
| predecessor=Cissa| successor=?Eadric
| death_date=685
| spouse=Eafe
| issue=
}}
Æthelwealh (fl.  – ) was ruler of the ancient South Saxon kingdom from before 674 till his death between 680 and 685. He was baptised in Mercia, becoming the first Christian king of Sussex. He was killed by a West Saxon prince, Cædwalla, who eventually became king of Wessex.

Background

The legendary foundation of the kingdom of Sussex, was in 477, when according to the Anglo-Saxon Chronicle, Ælle of Sussex and three of his sons are said to have landed at a place called Cymenshore and fought against the local Britons. The foundation story is regarded with some skepticism by most academics. The archaeological evidence, based on the cemeteries of the 5th century, shows that the main area of settlement was between the lower Ouse and Cuckmere rivers in East Sussex. However, by Æthelwealh's time the kingdom of the South Saxons seems to have been concentrated in the Selsey area, in the south-west of Sussex.

Ælle, the first king of the South Saxons was followed by Cissa of Sussex, according to the Anglo-Saxon Chronicle. There is a 150-year gap between Ælle, whose ancestry can not be established, and Æthelwealh, whose ancestry is more secure.

Alliance with the Mercians
Mercian power was ascending with Wulfhere of Mercia advancing into Jutish southern Hampshire and the Isle of Wight in about 681. Then according to Bede, Æthelwealh travelled to Mercia to be baptised, becoming the first Christian king of Sussex, with Wulfhere as his godfather. Bede in his Ecclesiastical History of the English People'' recorded that Æthelwealh, also married Eafe, who was the daughter of Eanfrith, a ruler of the Christian Hwicce people. Bede goes on to say that Wulfhere presented the Isle of Wight and Meonwara to Æthelwealh. This alliance between the South Saxons and the Mercians and their control of southern England and the Isle of Wight was a challenge to the West Saxons, whose power base at the time was in the upper Thames area.

Wilfrid, the exiled bishop of York, came to Sussex in 681 and converted the people of Sussex and the Isle of Wight to Christianity. Æthelwealh gave Wilfrid land in Selsey where he founded the Episcopal See of the South Saxons with its seat at Selsey Abbey.

West Saxon takeover

Cædwalla was a West Saxon prince who had apparently been banished by Centwine, king of Wessex. Cædwalla had spent his exile in the forests of the Chiltern and the Weald, and at some point had befriended Wilfrid. Cædwalla vowed that if Wilfrid would be his spiritual father then he would be his obedient son.

According to tradition, Cædwalla invaded Sussex in about 686 and was met by Æthelwealh at a point in the South Downs just southeast of Stoughton, close to the border with Hampshire, and it was here that Æthelwealh was defeated and slain. According to the same tradition, Æthelwealh lies buried in the southern barrow of the group that marks the spot.

The invasion stalled when Cædwalla was driven out by two of Æthelwealh's ealdormen, Berhthun and Andhun. In 687 Cædwalla became King of the West Saxons and a new invasion of Sussex began, this time it was successful. Bede describes how brutally Cædwalla suppressed the South Saxons.

After his victory, Cædwalla immediately summoned Wilfrid and made him supreme counsellor over his whole kingdom. Then when Wilfrid returned north, in 686, the see of Selsey was absorbed by the Diocese of the West Saxons, at Winchester. In temporal matters, Sussex was subject to the West Saxon kings, and in ecclesiastical matters, it was subject to the bishops of Winchester.

Relationship with Kent
In Kent, Hlothhere had been ruler since 673/4. This was until his nephew Eadric of Kent revolted against him and went to Sussex where, with help from Æthelwealh, he raised a South Saxon army. Eadric was then able to defeat Hlothhere, in about 685 and become ruler of Kent. On Æthelwealh's death, at the hands of Cædwalla, William of Malmesbury suggests that Eadric became king of the South Saxon kingdom. However, in 686, a West Saxon warband invaded Kent, under Cædwalla and his brother Mul, they removed Eadric from power and made Mul king of Kent.

See also
 History of Sussex

References

Notes

Citations

Bibliography
  Commissioned in the reign of Alfred the Great

External links
Retrieved 30 March 2007.

685 deaths
South Saxon monarchs
Anglo-Saxons killed in battle
7th-century English monarchs
Year of birth unknown
Monarchs killed in action
Converts to Christianity from pagan religions
Anglo-Saxon pagans